Fatmir Caca (born 28 May 1985) is an Albanian retired footballer who played the majority of his career for Albanian Superliga side Kastrioti Krujë as a defender, where he was also the team captain.

Honours
Kastrioti Krujë
Albanian Superliga Playoffs (1): 2009

External links

Fatmir Caca Facebook Fan Page

1985 births
Living people
People from Krujë
Albanian footballers
Association football defenders
KS Kastrioti players
KF Teuta Durrës players
KS Iliria players
FC Kamza players
Kategoria Superiore players